Adriana Alves (born 13 September 1995) is an Angolan sprinter. She competed in the 100 metres at the 2015 World Championships in Beijing without advancing from the first round.

International competitions

Personal bests
Outdoor
100 metres – 12.19 (-1.6 m/s, Beijing 2015)
200 metres – 25.14 (+1.5 m/s, Leiria 2015)
Indoor
60 metres – 7.56 (Lisbon 2016)
200 metres – 25.45 (Pombal 2016)

References

External links
All-Athletics profile

1995 births
Living people
Place of birth missing (living people)
Angolan female sprinters
World Athletics Championships athletes for Angola
S.L. Benfica athletes